Battlefield is a series of first-person shooter video games developed by Swedish company EA DICE and is published by American company Electronic Arts. It started out on Microsoft Windows and OS X with Battlefield 1942, which was released in 2002. The Battlefield series has been played by more than 50 million players worldwide as of August 2012.

The series features a particular focus on large maps, teamwork and combined arms warfare. The PC games in the series are mainly focused on online multiplayer.

Gameplay
Battlefield series games usually focus on large-scale, online multiplayer battles. Playing in squads has become a major element of games in the series. Apart from soldiers, also tanks, airplanes, and other vehicles may participate in these battles.

Since Battlefield 2, the series centrally recorded online stats for each player, allowing users to receive rank promotions and weapon unlocks based on their performance as well as awards such as medals, ribbons, and pins.

A class system is present within all the Battlefield games. Each class features a different type of primary weapon along with different equipment, differentiating roles on the battlefield.

The ability to engage other players in melee combat with a knife has been present in Battlefield games. Since Battlefield 2142, the series has included an award of dog tags for each player killed using a knife.

Since the introduction of Frostbite, almost fully destructible maps have become one of the most well-known features of the series.

Games

Development history

Battlefield 1942 was released on September 10, 2002, using the Refractor game engine, and set in World War II. It introduced the "Conquest" gameplay mode, in which players fought for "control points" throughout the map. Two expansion packs were released.

Battlefield Vietnam, released in 2004, moved the setting to the Vietnam War, and was built on an updated Refractor engine with various gameplay improvements, such as the ability to fire personal weapons while seated in vehicles, and visualizing dense foliage.

The 2005 release Battlefield 2 takes place in the modern day, depicting a war between the United States and China and the fictional Middle Eastern Coalition (MEC). Despite requiring numerous patches due to a large number of bugs and glitches in the game upon its release, it was a large commercial success, selling more than 2,250,000 copies worldwide, by July 2006. One expansion pack, Special Forces, which added Russia, exclusive missions, and new weapons and gadgets, and two booster packs, Armored Fury (adding three new battles in the USA) and Euro Force (adding the European Union), were also released. A similar game called Battlefield 2: Modern Combat was released for consoles, with a larger single player mode but limited online play.

Battlefield 2142 was released in 2006, taking place during a global ice age in the 22nd century. While most of it is graphically similar to Battlefield 2, it introduced a variety of equipment to unlock and battles between two giant "Titan" airships. The Northern Strike expansion pack was later released, adding new maps, vehicles, and a new game mode. Its use of in-game advertising was controversial among players and not well received.

Battlefield: Bad Company, released in 2008, is set in a near-future war between the United States and Russia, and follows a US Army company's escapades and their search for hidden gold. This new Battlefield game had a variety of vehicles for land, air and sea. It had a new destruction system that allowed the player to break and destroy environments, based on a new game engine named Frostbite, which replaced the Refractor engine used in earlier releases (with the exception of Battlefield 2: Modern Combat, which used RenderWare).

In 2009, EA released two download-only games, Battlefield Heroes, a free-to-play Refractor 2 engine game, supported by advertising and micropayments and Battlefield 1943, a Frostbite engine game, released in July 2009, for Xbox 360 and PlayStation 3, and was scheduled for release in Q1 2010, for PCs, but was cancelled.

In 2010, a sequel to Battlefield: Bad Company, Battlefield: Bad Company 2, was released, involving "B" Company's search for an electromagnetic pulse weapon. It features a larger multiplayer than its predecessor Bad Company, with updated graphics and realistic effects (e.g. bullet-drop). The game introduced the rush game mode and brought in weapons. It features a "VIP" system of content distribution where player with VIP codes gain early access to new maps. DICE also released an expansion for Bad Company 2, Battlefield: Bad Company 2: Vietnam, setting the game in the Vietnam War.

Battlefield 3 was announced in 2009, and in 2010 it was confirmed that gamers who pre-ordered Medal of Honor Limited Edition would receive Battlefield 3 forty-eight hours before the open beta was released. On February 4, 2011, the first teaser trailer for the game was revealed, with a preliminary release in the Fall of 2011. Among the features that remain in the game are Jets and the ability to go prone. The game allows 64 (on the PC) players as in all previous Battlefield titles, though the consoles allow for 24-player matches. The Battlefield 3 Beta was released on September 29, 2011. Battlefield 3 was released on October 25, 2011 and has received high review scores and has received awards from IGN.

On November 5, 2010, EASY Studios announced a follow-up to its free-to-play Battlefield Heroes, Battlefield Play4Free. EASY develops the free-to-play variants of Battlefield. Its latest offering gives players the same free-to-play pricing structure of Heroes, while still offering a more serious, core Battlefield experience (as opposed to Heroes lighthearted, cartoon-styled environment). Battlefield Play4Free went into open beta on April 4, 2011.

Battlefield 4 was announced on March 26, 2013. On July 17, 2012, it was announced that players who pre-order Medal of Honor: Warfighter would receive access to a Battlefield 4 beta. The beta for the game began on October 1 and ended on October 15 with a full release on October 29, 2013.

Information about the next entry in the series, Battlefield Hardline, was leaked on May 27, 2014, and officially unveiled on June 9, 2014, during E3. The game was developed by Visceral Games and, unlike previous installments in the franchise, is centered around a cops-and-robbers theme.

Battlefield: Bad Company 3 was an upcoming entry into the series, a follow-up to 2010's Battlefield: Bad Company 2. General Manager of DICE, Karl-Magnus Troedsson stated in a 2014 interview with Eurogamer that the game is not in active development as the studio doesn't know what exactly fans loved about the series as there has never been a clear line of the matter and they do not want to risk destroying the series. Despite this, DICE has made it clear that they will be developing Bad Company 3 at some point.

In July 2015, CFO of EA Blake Jorgensen announced a new Battlefield title would be released in 2016. This was followed up by Dan Vaderlind, EA DICE Development Director, announcing that since Star Wars Battlefront has been released, he will now be focused on the upcoming Battlefield title. On May 6, 2016, Battlefield 1 was officially announced, with an official reveal trailer on YouTube, and was released on October 21, 2016.

In a May 2018 live reveal event it was confirmed that it the next installment would be a World War II game after several leaks suggested it would be set during this period, with the title revealed as Battlefield V. Battlefield V was released later that year on November 20, 2018 while also offering certain players early access to the game as early as November 9, 2018.

Battlefield 2042 was released on November 19, 2021. During EA's 2020/2021 Q3 earnings call it was revealed that the game will be the first to release on PlayStation 5 and Xbox Series X|S, utilizing their processing power to feature more players than ever in the online portion of the game. Additionally, it saw multiple innovations in multiplayer, social, and competition aspects that are new to the franchise. After 2042 was met with a poor launch, it was announced that Oskar Gabrielson, the general manager of DICE, would be stepping down from his position, and Rebecka Coutaz, former Managing Director of Ubisoft Annecy, would replace him. Vince Zampella of Respawn Entertainment and Ripple Effect Studios (the latter of which had created 2042s Portal Mode) will be heading the Battlefield franchise. It was also reported that EA game director Marcus Lehto is building a new Seattle-based studio focused on story content for Battlefield, while Ripple Effect is developing a new "Battlefield experience" set in the game's universe.

Battlefield Mobile was a free-to-play game for the Android. An iOS release was planned. Open beta version was released in November 2022. The game was cancelled on January 31, 2023. The developer of the game, Industrial Toys, was also shut down.

TV series
In October 2012, Fox Broadcasting Company announced their intentions to make a one-hour-long television show based on Battlefield: Bad Company. The show was to be written by executive producer John Eisendrath and co-produced by Patrick Bach and Patrick O'Brien of Electronic Arts, and Doug Robinson of Happy Madison. Nothing has been developed after their announcement.

In July 2016, Paramount Television announced that it will adapt the game series for television. Anonymous Content's Michael Sugar and Ashley Zalta will executive produce. Nothing has been announced since.

References

External links
 

 
Electronic Arts franchises
First-person shooters by series
Video game franchises
Video game franchises introduced in 2002
Electronic Arts games